Pentapodus is a genus of threadfin breams native to the eastern Indian Ocean and the western Pacific Ocean.

Species
The currently recognized species in this genus are:
 Pentapodus aureofasciatus B. C. Russell, 2001 (yellowstripe threadfin bream)
 Pentapodus bifasciatus (Bleeker, 1848) (white-shouldered whiptail)
 Pentapodus caninus (G. Cuvier, 1830) (small-toothed whiptail)
 Pentapodus emeryii (J. Richardson, 1843) (double whiptail)
 Pentapodus komodoensis G. R. Allen & Erdmann, 2012 (Komodo whiptail)
 Pentapodus nagasakiensis (S. Tanaka (I), 1915) (Japanese whiptail)
 Pentapodus numberii G. R. Allen & Erdmann, 2009 (Papuan whiptail)
 Pentapodus paradiseus (Günther, 1859) (paradise whiptail)
 Pentapodus porosus (Valenciennes, 1830) (Northwest Australian whiptail)
 Pentapodus setosus (Valenciennes, 1830) (butterfly whiptail)
 Pentapodus trivittatus (Bloch, 1791) (three-striped whiptail)
 Pentapodus vitta Quoy & Gaimard, 1824 (striped whiptail)

References

Nemipteridae